Randy Woelfel is the former chief executive officer of Nova Chemicals, a $6 billion plastics and chemical company founded in 1954.

Woelfel began his career at Shell Oil in 1977. He has a B.S. in Chemical Engineering from Rice University and an MBA from the MIT Sloan School of Management.

References

MIT Sloan School of Management alumni
Rice University alumni
Living people
Year of birth missing (living people)